The Cherokee Female Seminary, (not to be confused with the first Cherokee Female Seminary), was built by the Cherokee Nation in 1889 near Tahlequah, Indian Territory. It replaced their original girls' seminary that had burned down on Easter Sunday two years before. It was listed on the National Register of Historic Places in 1973.

The Cherokee Council chose to rebuild the school on a  site north of Tahlequah, near Hendricks Spring. Two years later, on May 7, 1889, the dedication ceremonies were held in honor of the new building. The Female Seminary was owned and operated by the Cherokee Nation until March 6, 1909, after Oklahoma had been admitted as a state as a state in 1907, and tribal land claims were extinguished.

At that time the new State Legislature of Oklahoma passed an act providing for the creation of Northeastern State Normal School at Tahlequah, Oklahoma. The act also authorized purchase from the Cherokee Tribal Government of the building, land, and equipment of the Cherokee Female Seminary. At the start of the next academic year, on September 14, the state held its first classes at the newly founded Northeastern State Normal School, primarily intended to train teachers of elementary grades. The institution has been developed over the decades and is now Northeastern State University, offering a range of curriculum and graduate programs.

The Cherokee were the first Native American Female seminaries were a larger cultural movement across the United States in the mid-nineteenth century, by which time they had taken over the role played traditionally by the boarding school, which had offered a more family-like atmosphere.

Seminary Hall
What is now called Seminary Hall, in honor of the Cherokee Seminary, is the oldest building on NSU's campus. It was built in 1889 by St. Louis architect C.E. Illsley, who designed it in the Romanesque Revival style, complete with fortress-like turrets flanking the main entrance and a clock tower that resembles a church steeple and rises two stories above the rest of the building. In 1994 the building was completely restored.

The building was renovated and upgraded in 2020, with the work aided by a $4 million grant from the Cherokee Nation.  That work included using salvaged wood and brick from the 1800s to match the original building materials where needed, and replacing aluminum window frames from a prior renovation with custom wood frames typical of the period. In addition, half-octagon-shaped roof dormers were added, as they were drawn in the original architect's plans.

The building now houses classrooms along with academic and faculty offices. It was the first campus classroom building wired for multimedia instruction. At the main entrance of the building are three murals painted in the 1930s as a WPA project by Stephen Mopope and Jack Hokeah (both Kiowa) and Albin Jake (Pawnee).

See also
Isabel Cobb
Lulu M. Hefner
Rachel Caroline Eaton
Cherokee Male Seminary
Female seminaries
Women in education in the United States

References

External links

Tribal colleges and universities
Northeastern State University
School buildings on the National Register of Historic Places in Oklahoma
Buildings and structures in Tahlequah, Oklahoma
Cherokee Nation (1794–1907)
Female seminaries in the United States
Historic American Buildings Survey in Oklahoma
National Register of Historic Places in Cherokee County, Oklahoma
Women in Oklahoma